Buffy the Vampire Slayer: The Album is a soundtrack album featuring music from the Buffy the Vampire Slayer TV series.

The album is made up mostly of tracks by little-known artists, though some better known ones, such as Garbage and Alison Krauss, are also featured. A small part of the television show's original score is also included. Although the album was released in 1999, it contains music from Buffy'''s first four seasons, although a few songs never appeared in an episode at all.

A follow up, Buffy the Vampire Slayer: Radio Sunnydale – Music from the TV Series'', was released in 2003.

Track listing
 Nerf Herder – "Buffy the Vampire Slayer Theme" (from Season 3 onwards)
 Guided by Voices – "Teenage FBI"
 Garbage – "Temptation Waits"
 Velvet Chain – "Strong" (from "Never Kill a Boy on the First Date")
 Hepburn – "I Quit"
 Furslide – "Over My Head"
 Bif Naked – "Lucky" (from "The Harsh Light of Day")
 Black Lab – "Keep Myself Awake" (from "The I in Team")
 K's Choice – "Virgin State of Mind" (from "Doppelgangland")
 Superfine – "Already Met You" (from "Teacher's Pet")
 Face to Face – "The Devil You Know (God Is a Man)" (from "Where the Wild Things Are")
 Kim Ferron – "Nothing But You" (from "Beer Bad")
 Alison Krauss and Union Station – "It Doesn't Matter" (from "When She Was Bad")
 The Sundays – "Wild Horses" (from "The Prom")
 Four Star Mary – "Pain" (Slayer Mix) (from "Bewitched, Bothered and Bewildered", "Dead Man's Party" and "Living Conditions")
 Splendid – "Charge" (from "I Only Have Eyes for You")
 Rasputina – "Transylvanian Concubine" (from "Surprise")
 Christophe Beck – "Close Your Eyes" (Buffy/Angel Love Theme) (from "Becoming, Part 2")

Certifications and sales

References 

Album, The
Television soundtracks